Kuttichaathan is a 1975 Indian Malayalam film,  directed by Crossbelt Mani. The film stars KP Ummer, Vidhubala, Bahadoor and Vincent in the lead roles. The film has musical score by R. K. Shekhar.

Cast

K. P. Ummer
Vidhubala
Vincent
Bahadoor
Rajakokila
Adoor Bhasi
Sreelatha Namboothiri
Kuthiravattam Pappu
Meena

Soundtrack
The music was composed by R. K. Shekhar and the lyrics were written by Vayalar and Bharanikkavu Sivakumar.

References

External links
 

1975 films
1970s Malayalam-language films